The Jimmy Parkinson Show was an Australian television series which aired 1959 to 1960 on Sydney station ATN-7. It was a weekly half-hour music series. Like most 1950s Australian series, it aired in a single city only. 

An article in the Sydney Morning Herald newspaper, while not mentioning the series by name, does provide some information on the series. It described Parkinson as a "balladist", and called him "one of the most promising performers that TV has produced in Sydney".

References

External links
The Jimmy Parkinson Show at IMDb

1959 Australian television series debuts
1960 Australian television series endings
Australian music television series
Black-and-white Australian television shows
English-language television shows
Seven Network original programming